DNA recombination may refer to:
 Genetic recombination, a natural aspect of DNA repair mechanisms
 Homologous recombination, one common form of recombination in eukaryotes
 Recombinant DNA technology, in which genetic changes are induced in the laboratory using features of the above mechanisms